USS SC-38, during her service life known as USS Submarine Chaser No. 38 or USS S.C. 38, was an SC-1-class submarine chaser built for the United States Navy during World War I.

SC-38 was a wooden-hulled 110-foot (34 m) submarine chaser built at the New York Navy Yard at Brooklyn, New York. She was commissioned on 1 February 1918 as USS Submarine Chaser No. 38, abbreviated at the time as USS S.C. 38.

In 1919, Submarine Chaser No. 38 participated in North Sea minesweeping operations to clear the North Sea Mine Barrage. During these operations, she struck a mine on 4 September 1919 and was damaged, but suffered no casualties.  She was salvaged, and the Navy sold her to Thomas Lee of Ipswich, England, in December 1919.

The U.S. Navy adopted its modern hull number system on 17 July 1920, after Submarine Chaser No. 38 had left Navy service. Had she remained in Navy service at that date, she would have been classified as SC-38 and her name would have been shortened to USS SC-38, and she now is referred to retrospectively by this name.

References 
 
 NavSource Online: Submarine Chaser Photo Archive: SC-38
 The Subchaser Archives: The History of U.S. Submarine Chasers in the Great War Hull number: SC-38
 Woofenden, Todd A. Hunters of the Steel Sharks: The Submarine Chasers of World War I. Bowdoinham, Maine: Signal Light Books, 2006. .

SC-1-class submarine chasers
World War I patrol vessels of the United States
Ships built in Brooklyn
1918 ships